William David Gould (born April 24, 1963 in Los Angeles, California) is an American musician and producer. He is best known as the bassist of Faith No More.

Biography

Early years
Billy said he is of Hungarian descent from his father's side. Gould started playing the bass while he was at Loyola High School in Los Angeles with future Faith No More keyboardist Roddy Bottum. His first band during these early years was named "The Animated," a genre-bending new wave outfit that sounded something like a cross between The Buzzcocks, XTC and Michael Jackson. That band also featured future FNM vocalist Chuck Mosley on keyboards, and Mark Stewart (aka Stew) on guitar, of Negro Problem fame. In the early 1980s he moved to San Francisco to begin his studies and got involved with several underground bands. At this time, he met drummer Mike Bordin and guitarist Jim Martin. Soon after that Gould formed a band with Bordin, keyboardist Wade Worthington (quickly replaced with Roddy Bottum), and guitarist/vocalist Mike 'The Man' Morris named Faith No Man, which eventually became Faith No More once Morris was out of the band.

In the mid-nineties, Gould began to work as producer and in 1997 he co-produced Faith No More's Album of the Year with the former Swans drummer Roli Mosimann. Since then, he has become the CEO of Koolarrow Records and worked on various projects as a producer or guest musician.

In February 2009, it was announced that Faith No More would reform for a tour and possibly recording.

In 2015, after their longest gap between albums, Faith No More released their seventh studio album Sol Invictus. The album received a positive reception from professional critics and fans alike.

Other collaborations 

In the 1990s Gould was in the original line-up of the Mexican grindcore band Brujeria. He was also involved in several supergroups, such as Shandi's Addiction (with Maynard Keenan, Brad Wilk and Tom Morello) as well as Black Diamond Brigade (with Norwegian rock musicians Euroboy, Torgny Amdam, Tarjei Strøm and Sigurd Wongraven). Furthermore, he played with Wayne Kramer, and Fear Factory, and produced CMX's Vainajala album. His guest appearances include recordings for Romanian band Coma, and the production of "Living Targets" by German group Beatsteaks, Slovenia's Elvis Jackson, and the album "7" for the German rock band Harmful, in which he also toured with them the whole year 2007 as guitar player.

In 2007, Gould joined up with the all star band Fear and the Nervous System, formed by Korn guitarist James "Munky" Shaffer. The band also features Bad Religion drummer Brooks Wackerman.

During the same year, Gould joined as bassist in Jello Biafra's new band The Axis of Evildoers along with Ralph Spight (Victim's Family) on guitar, and Jon Weiss on drums.  They made their debut at Jello Biafra's 50th-birthday celebration June 16 and 17, 2008 at the Great American Music Hall in San Francisco. The band has since been renamed Jello Biafra and the Guantanamo School of Medicine and an album Audacity of Hype was released on October 20, 2009.

In 2011, he released an experimental album called "The Talking Book", a collaboration between himself and sound artist Jared Blum, known for his various projects on the Gigante Sound label.
In 2012, he collaborated with Charles Hayward of This Heat and Mads Heldtberg on a project and release entitled House of Hayduk. Also in 2011, Billy contributed to the production of the soundtrack for the documentary "The Sequential Art" , by Norwegian director Espen J. Jörgensen.

In 2013, he reunited with Espen J. Jörgensen to provide synth, edits, recomposing and beats for  a 'groovy and experimental EP' titled Fugly.

In 2018, Gould joined Wayne Kramer (guitarist)'s MC50 band, celebrating the 50th anniversary of the release of the MC5 album, Kick Out The Jams.  This band also featured: Kim Thayil of Soundgarden, Brendan Canty of Fugazi, and Marcus Durant of Zen Guerilla.

Koolarrow records 

Since 1999, Gould has run an independent record label Koolarrow Records that has specialized in international acts and challenging artists such as LA's Flattbush, Seattle's Kultur Shock, Brujeria, Hog Molly (featuring Tad Doyle), Bosnian's Dubioza Kolektiv, San Francisco's La Plebe, German rock band Harmful, Alexander Hacke (of Einsturzende Neubauten), Como Asesinar a Felipes from Chile, former Danish experimental outfit Durefursog, and Mexican Dubwiser.

Equipment and style

For most of Faith No More's career, he has used a Zon bass, but started with a Gibson Grabber bass and used that for the first two Faith No More records up until early 1988 when he got his full endorsement deal with Aria basses which he was endorsed until late 1992. He used his prototype 1986 Aria Pro II SB-Integra bass which he received in 1986 on 1989's The Real Thing. And he used his 1990 Aria Pro II IGB-DLX bass from summer 1990 to late 1992 on 1992's Angel Dust. Even though he did have his SB Integra bass by 1986 he still used the Gibson for most of touring and recording from 1986 to early 1988 when the Grabber had according to Gould from a Q&A for the 30th anniversary of The Real Thing album, "was being literally held together with duct tape and the Aria was a better bass overall". In the music video for their song "Evidence", he is seen using a Fender Jazz. He began with Peavey amplifiers, he used the Peavey Mark III Bass Head on We Care a Lot, and Introduce Yourself and used the Peavey Mark IV Bass Head on The Real Thing and Angel Dust. And he has used them his entire career, mainly for the way he loved that the speakers in their amps broke up easily. He also at times used Ampeg SVT heads and cabinets too off and on at select shows, mainly during the first part of the Second Coming tour. He stated that he used a Fender Bassman 300 for the recording of 2015's Sol Invictus, saying that "it sounded like a tractor going through a supercharger". He also in the  90's used a Peavey TB Raxx rack preamp recommended to him by Lee Sklar at the 1990 MTV VMA's, and a Tech 21 Sansamp PSA-1. Starting around 2014 was endorsed by and began using Aguilar pedals, amps & cabinets, but later used Darkglass amps, cabs & effects. He is known for employing a wide variety of playing styles, alternating between using a plectrum, slapping, and fingerstyle. He also used an Ibanez Tube Screamer and a DOD Stereo Bass Flanger on The Real Thing album and the following tour for that album. Here is a list of the strings he has used over the years: Rotosound Swing Bass 66 (Early years-Early 1989) Dean Markley Blue Steels (Mid 1989) D'Addario Pro Steels/Nickel Bass Strings (Late 1989-1997) Dunlop Nickel Bass Strings (1997-Present Day).

Discography

As a band member

Brujeria
1993: Matando Güeros
1995: Raza Odiada
2000: Brujerizmo

Fear and the Nervous System
2011: Fear and the Nervous System

Jello Biafra and the Guantanamo School of Medicine
2009: Audacity of Hype
2011: Enhanced Methods of Questioning (EP)

Harmful
2007: Seven

Bill Gould & Jared Blum
2011: The Talking Book

Bill Gould & Espen J. Jörgensen
 2013: Fugly

As a featured musician
1994: Milk Cult – Burn or Bury, "Bow Kiness Static"
2005: Fear Factory – Transgression, "Echo of my Scream", "Supernova"
2006: Coma – Nerostitele, "Mai Presus De Cuvinte"
2006:  Jeff Walker und Die Fluffers – Welcome to Carcass Cuntry
2012: Angertea – Nr. 4: Songs Exhaled, "No Computation"
2022: Corvus Corax – Era Metallum

Remixes
1995 "Engove" – instrumental remix of "Caffeine", originally by Faith No More. Appeared on Metallurgy, Vol. 1
1997 "Pristina (Billy Gould Mix)", appeared on "Last Cup of Sorrow" single.
1998 "Du riechst so gut", originally by Rammstein. Faith No More remix.

As a producer
1997 Naive – Post Alcoholic Anxieties
1997 Faith No More – Album of the Year (together with Roli Mosimann)
1998 CMX – Vainajala
1999 Think About Mutation – Highlife
2001 The Beatsteaks – Living Targets
2001 Kultur Shock – FUCC the INS
2007 Harmful – 7
2009 Elvis Jackson – Against the Gravity
2015 Faith No More – Sol Invictus

Other
1999 Spazz – Crush Kill Destroy (Mastering)

References

1963 births
Living people
American heavy metal bass guitarists
American male bass guitarists
Record producers from California
Faith No More members
Alternative metal bass guitarists
Guitarists from Los Angeles
American male guitarists
20th-century American bass guitarists
Brujeria (band) members
Fear and the Nervous System members
Jello Biafra and the Guantanamo School of Medicine members